4Q108 (or 4QCantc) is a fragment containing a portion of the Song of Songs (3:7–8) in Hebrew. Fragments from three such scrolls were found in Cave 4 at Qumran. These, and 6Q6 from Cave 6, estimated from 2nd century BCE, comprise the total witness to the Song from the Dead Sea Scrolls, known so far.

Identification
It is evident that 4Q108 is not from the other two manuscripts of the Song found in the cave. The last two words of Song 3:7, g'bore Israel ("warriors of Israel") are already accounted for in 4Q106; and the letters of 4Q107 are formed by an observably different hand to 4Q108. The manner of composition (ductus) of the letters aleph and shin differs between the manuscripts. Additionally, the lacuna in the second column of 4Q107 does not provide enough space to accommodate 4Q108.

Contents
4Q108 is a "tiny fragment"
containing only ten letters from two lines — five letters each from verses seven and eight of chapter three. The five letters from verse eight are a single word  (’ăḥūzî), the passive participle of the verb meaning grasp. So 4Q108 reads:
[7Behold the seat of So]lomon six[ty warriors surrounding it, from the warriors of]
[Israel, 8all of them] equipped [with sword ...]

Features
The Masoretic Text spells the verb of verse eight with only four letters; 4Q108, however, contains a consonant (vav) representing one of the distinctive vowels of the passive participle.
The passive construction used here — aḥuzi ḥereb (grasped of sword) — is not unique to either the Song (see Ezekiel 43:6) or to Hebrew.

See also
 List of Hebrew Bible manuscripts
Biblical manuscript
Tanakh at Qumran

References

External links
Emanuel Tov. 'A Categorized List of All the "Biblical Texts" Found in the Judean Desert.' Dead Sea Discoveries 8 (2001): 67-84.
4Q108 at the Leon Levy Dead Sea Scrolls Digital Library

Dead Sea Scrolls
1st-century BC biblical manuscripts